Kevin Bull is a professional "obstacle athlete" and independent stock trader and businessman. Kevin has competed on the television shows American Ninja Warrior (NBC), Spartan Team Challenge (NBC), and Team Ninja Warrior (Esquire Network). In addition to winning several episodes, he is regularly named as a fan favorite. Kevin was featured in a Jeep Commercial in 2018.

During high school and college Kevin competed in track and field events, ending his academic career as an All-American and California State Champion in the decathlon, pole vault, and the 4 × 400 m relay (Division 2) at CSU Stanislaus.  In the 2006–2007 year Kevin received the Scholar Athlete of the year award for the CCAA for both these achievements and his 3.92 GPA.

Kevin is influential in the emerging sport of "obstacle athletics," having founded the Pitfall Obstacle League in 2014 to further extreme obstacle course competition. He holds an endorsement deal with CircusTrix, the largest Trampoline Park Company in the world and builder of "American Ninja Warrior"-style obstacle courses in the U.S., boasting over 320 parks across 20 countries. Kevin Bull Launched the CircusTrix park DojoBoom in November 2017 which he operated until October 2019

Kevin has a distinctive hairless style, caused by the medical condition Alopecia. He volunteers at the Children's Alopecia Project, raising awareness and providing support to young people who share this condition. He is featured in the upcoming reality-TV movie "Hairless."

References

External links 
 Kevin Bull Facebook page
 IMDB
 Commercial Work

Living people
American track and field athletes
Year of birth missing (living people)
American Ninja Warrior contestants